The IJF World Tour is a worldwide top-tier judo tour, organized by the International Judo Federation since 2009.

IJF World Tour tournaments
The IJF World Tour consists of the annual World Championships and World Masters, a series of Grand Slam and Grand Prix tournaments, as well as the annual continental championships organized by the continental judo unions and the annual World Juniors Championships. achievements in these tournament are awarded with ranking points, used to determine athlete's world ranking.

IJF World Ranking

2017–present

2013–2016

Timeline
Legend
 OG — Olympic Games
 WC — World Championships
 JU — World Juniors Championships
 MA — World Masters
 GS — Grand Slam
 GP — Grand Prix
 AfC — African Championships
 AfG — African Games
 AmC — Pan American Championships
 AmG — Pan American Games
 AsC — Asian Championships
 AsG — Asian Games
 EuC — European Championships
 EuG — European Games
 OcC — Oceanian Championships

2009–2019

2020–

References

 
World Tour
Judo